Amy Louis Smith (born 24 July 1987 in Kidderminster, Worcestershire) is a British swimmer.

Smith was at the pinnacle of sprinting for British women and a member of the national swim team for a decade. She had a busy programme at the 2012 Summer Olympics where she competed for the Great British team in the Women's 4 x 100 metre freestyle relay, finishing in 5th place in the final.

She also competed in the Women's 50 metre freestyle winning her heat swim off to qualify for the semi final.  She also made the semi final for the Women's 100 metre freestyle but did not advance and swam the freestyle leg of the Women's 4 x 100 metre medley relay in the heat stage.

At the 2014 Commonwealth Games, she was part of the England 4 x 100 m freestyle team that won the silver and swam the heat for the silver medal winning 4 x 100 m medley team.

Smith has now retired from competitive swimming but instead turned her attention to helping coach the next generation of swimmers through her swimming consultancy Swim Swift Elite with her partner Joseph Roebuck.

See also
 List of Commonwealth Games medallists in swimming (women)

References

External links
 
 
 
 
 
 
 

English female swimmers
1987 births
Living people
Sportspeople from Kidderminster
Olympic swimmers of Great Britain
Swimmers at the 2012 Summer Olympics
English female freestyle swimmers
European Aquatics Championships medalists in swimming
Commonwealth Games medallists in swimming
Commonwealth Games silver medallists for England
Swimmers at the 2010 Commonwealth Games
Swimmers at the 2014 Commonwealth Games
Medallists at the 2010 Commonwealth Games
Medallists at the 2014 Commonwealth Games